Kian Fitz-Jim (born 5 July 2003) is a Dutch professional footballer who plays as a midfielder for Jong Ajax.

Club career
On 18 June 2019, Fitz-Jim signed with AFC Ajax. he made his professional debut with Jong Ajax in a 2–1 Eerste Divisie loss to SC Telstar on 21 December 2020.

He made his senior team debut in a friendly against FC Utrecht on 24 March 2021.

International career
Born in the Netherlands, Fitz-Jim was born to a Surinamese father and mother from Hong Kong.  He is a youth international for the Netherlands.

References

External links
 Profile at the AFC Ajax website
 
 OnsOranje U15 Profile
 OnsOranje U16 Profile
 OnsOranje U17 Profile
 OnsOranje U19 Profile

2003 births
Living people
Dutch people of Hong Kong descent
Dutch sportspeople of Surinamese descent
Dutch footballers
Footballers from Amsterdam
Association football midfielders
Netherlands youth international footballers
Eredivisie players
Eerste Divisie players
AFC Ajax players
Jong Ajax players